Carl Carey Anderson (December 2, 1877 – October 1, 1912) was a U.S. Representative from Ohio. He was elected to two terms, serving from 1909 until 1912, when he died as a result of an automobile accident at the age of 34.

Early life and career
Born in Bluffton, Ohio, Anderson moved to Sandusky County in 1881 with his parents, who settled in Fremont. He attended the common schools, and then worked as a traveling salesman. He moved to Fostoria, Seneca County, and engaged in the manufacture of underwear.

Political career
Anderson was elected mayor of Fostoria, Ohio, in 1905 and again in 1907, on each occasion for a term of two years. He served as president of the city hospital board and director in a number of manufacturing enterprises.

Congress
Anderson was elected as a Democrat to the Sixty-first and Sixty-second Congresses and served from March 4, 1909, until his death in an automobile accident near Fostoria, Ohio, October 1, 1912. 

He was interred in Oakwood Cemetery (Fremont, Ohio).

See also
List of United States Congress members who died in office (1900–49)

Sources

Carl C. Anderson, late a representative from Ohio, Memorial addresses delivered in the House of Representatives and Senate frontispiece 1913

1877 births
1912 deaths
People from Fremont, Ohio
Road incident deaths in Ohio
Democratic Party members of the United States House of Representatives from Ohio

Mayors of places in Ohio
People from Fostoria, Ohio
People from Bluffton, Ohio
19th-century American politicians